A Dog's Way Home is a 2017 novel by American author W. Bruce Cameron, inspired by many true stories.

Plot
This story starts out with Bella as a puppy living under an old shack with her family in Denver, Colorado. She finds her way into the arms of Lucas, a young man who adopts her. When Bella becomes separated from Lucas after she was impounded by the animal control due to Denver's pitbull ban, she soon finds herself on a 400-mile journey to reunite with her owner. Along the way, the dog meets an orphaned mountain lion, a veteran and some friendly strangers who happen to cross her path. She will soon find that Lucas was waiting for her. When she finds Lucas the animal control officer tries to take her but ends up failing.

Reception
The novel had a mostly positive reception because it shared a powerful message on how breed discrimination against dogs, especially the pitbulls, affected the dogs’ lives and their owners’ lives. This novel also taught readers that pitbulls are definitely not “dangerous” dogs, convinced the readers to stand up to the discriminating BSL (Breed Specific Law) and demand that city governments, especially in Denver, repeal this unfair law. The book was not without its critics like PETA who criticized the book for oversimplifying the Breed specific legislation issue and the perceived danger of pitbulls.

Adaptation
In 2019, the novel was adapted into a film of the same name.

References

2017 American novels
American novels adapted into films
Novels about dogs
Novels set in Denver
Forge Books books